Viveca Lindfors (born 30 January 1999) is a Finnish retired figure skater. She is the 2019 European bronze medalist, 2018 CS Finlandia Trophy bronze medalist, 2018 CS Tallinn Trophy bronze medalist, 2018 Nordic champion, and the 2019 Finnish national champion.

Personal life
Viveca Lindfors was born on 30 January 1999 in Helsinki, Finland. She is the second eldest of five children. Her younger sisters, Monica and Fanny, and younger brother, Matias, have competed in figure skating, while her elder brother, Axel, is a hockey player. Monica Lindfors is the 2017 Finnish Junior ice dance champion with Juho Pirinen.

Career

Early career
Lindfors began learning to skate in 2004. She competed on the advanced novice level in the 2012–2013 season, winning silver at the Finnish Championships and bronze at the Triglav Trophy.

In 2013–2014, Lindfors moved up to the junior level. After taking bronze at the Finnish Championships, she won gold medals at Skate Helena and the Dragon Trophy.

2014–2015 season: Senior debut
Coached by Virpi Horttana at Espoon Jäätaiturit, Lindfors debuted on the ISU Junior Grand Prix (JGP) series, placing eighteenth at an October event in Zagreb, Croatia. She spent the rest of the season competing on the senior level. Appearing at her first ISU Challenger Series (CS) event, she finished tenth at the Warsaw Cup in November. After becoming the Finnish senior national bronze medalist, Lindfors won gold at Skate Helena and bronze at The Nordics. She concluded her season at the Hellmut Seibt Memorial, where she finished fourth.

2015–2016 season: Debut at Worlds and Europeans
Starting her season on the JGP series, Lindfors placed eleventh in Riga, Latvia and ninth in Toruń, Poland. She then competed at a pair of CS events, finishing fifth at the 2015 Finlandia Trophy and fourth at the 2015 Tallinn Trophy. In December, she finished fourth at the Finnish Championships, only 0.13 behind the bronze medal winner after winning the short program and placing fourth in the free skate. As the Finnish lady with the highest season's best, she was selected to compete at the 2016 European Championships in Bratislava, Slovakia. She qualified for the free skate by placing eleventh in the short program and finished eighth overall in her ISU Championship debut. She won the silver medal at the 2016 Nordics Open.

In March, Lindfors placed twenty-fifth in the short program at the 2016 World Junior Championships in Debrecen, Hungary; she missed the cut-off for the free skate by one spot. In April, she finished twentieth at the 2016 World Championships in Boston after placing twenty-third in the short and sixteenth in the free.

2016–2017 season

Lindfors had a back problem in the summer and autumn of 2016. She started her season by placing eleventh at the 2016 CS Lombardia Trophy and tenth at the 2016 CS Finlandia Trophy. At the 2017 Finnish Championships she won the bronze medal behind Emmi Peltonen and Jenni Saarinen, placing second in the short program and third in the free skate. She finished twenty-third at the 2017 European Championships in Ostrava, Czech Republic. She stated that she had a heart problem.

2017–2018 season
After placing tenth at the 2017 ISU Junior Grand Prix in Latvia, Lindfors competed at the 2017 CS Nebelhorn Trophy, the final qualifying opportunity for the 2018 Winter Olympics. Due to her result, sixth, Finland received a spot in the Olympic ladies' event. In December, she finished second to Emmi Peltonen at the Finnish Championships.

In January, Lindfors placed fourteenth, five spots below Peltonen, at the 2018 European Championships in Moscow. Peltonen, therefore, was selected to represent Finland at the Olympics. Lindfors was assigned to the 2018 World Championships in Milan, where she placed sixteenth.

2018–2019 season: European bronze medal
Lindfors started her season at the 2018 CS Lombardia Trophy, placing third in the short program, sixth in the free, and fifth overall. In October, she won her first-ever Challenger Series medal – bronze at the 2018 CS Finlandia Trophy. In November, she made her senior Grand Prix debut, placing eighth at the 2018 Grand Prix of Helsinki, and won bronze at the 2018 CS Tallinn Trophy. The following month, she took gold at the Finnish Championships.

In January, at the 2019 European Championships in Minsk, Lindfors placed fourth in the short program, 0.03 points behind Alexia Paganini.  In the free skate, she placed third, behind Sofia Samodurova and Stanislava Konstantinova, and won the bronze medal overall.  She was the first Finnish skater to stand on the European podium since Kiira Korpi took silver in 2012.  Speaking afterward, Lindfors said "It feels a bit surreal because I have wanted this, but at the same time I can’t believe it’s true."

Lindfors was named as Finland's sole ladies' entry to the 2019 World Championships in Saitama, but she subsequently withdrew due to injury.

2019–2020 season: Injury and retirement
Lindfors initially planned to compete at the 2019 CS Finlandia Trophy, but withdrew due to ongoing back problems.  She subsequently withdrew from both of her Grand Prix assignments as well.

In late July, she announced her retirement from competitive figure skating, citing the fact that she was unable to train at an elite level because of her back problems, and announced that she would be attending University of Turku in the fall.

Programs

Competitive highlights 
GP: Grand Prix; CS: Challenger Series; JGP: Junior Grand Prix

Detailed results
Small medals for short and free programs awarded only at ISU Championships. ISU Personal bests in bold.

References

External links
 

1999 births
Finnish female single skaters
Living people
Sportspeople from Helsinki
European Figure Skating Championships medalists
21st-century Finnish women